is a Japanese short story by Osamu Dazai. Published in 1940, "Run, Melos!" is a widely read classic in Japanese schools.

The story is a reworking of Friedrich Schiller's ballad Die Bürgschaft, which tells the story of Moerus and Selinuntius (who have lent their names to Dazai's characters as well), originally Damon and Pythias. Schiller's version is based on an ancient Greek legend recorded by the Roman author Gaius Julius Hyginus. 

The most prominent theme of "Run, Melos!" is unwavering friendship. Despite hardships, the protagonist Melos does his best to save his friend's life, and in the end his efforts are rewarded.  

In the 1956 fiscal year, Run Melos! was used as a Japanese textbook for teaching material for the first time in middle high school.

Story 
Melos is a naïve young shepherd with a sense of equity. The land in which he lives is ruled by Dionysius, a tyrant king who because of his distrust of people and solitude, has killed many people, including his own family members. When Melos hears about the King's deeds one day, he becomes enraged. He decides to assassinate the King, and to this end he sneaks into the castle with a knife, but is caught and arrested. Melos defiantly owns up to his plan to kill the King but pleads with the cynical tyrant to postpone his execution for three days so that he can return home to organise his younger sister's marriage. As collateral for his pledge to return, Melos offers his friend Selinuntius as hostage, to be executed in his stead should Melos not return in time. The King agrees to Melos' conditions and offers him a full pardon should he return moments too late. Indignant Melos insists that saving his own life is not his intention. Informed of the situation Selinuntius readily agrees to the role for which Melos has volunteered him without consultation.

Back in his home town Melos persuades first his eager sister and then her hesitant fiancé that there is urgent need for them to be married, without revealing his reasons. While the wedding festivities are in progress, Melos retires for some rest but oversleeps and only sets off to return to the city the next morning. Along the way he encounters many tribulations, such as a broken bridge due to the overflowing of the river and attacks by bandits. The running and all of these impediments along the way exhaust him. In his fatigue becoming indifferent to the fate of his friend and the impact Selinuntius' death will have on his own reputation, Melos slows down and nearly gives up while taking a break. After long contemplation of the consequence—for the sake of his friend's life and to prevent the King from claiming to have been justified in his cynical view of his subjects—and reinvigorated from drinking water from a clear spring, he rushes off with renewed urgency. As the now desperate Melos runs back to Syracuse, a mutual acquaintance attempts to persuade him to give up, claiming there is no rush to return since Melos is already too late.

At sundown Melos finally arrives at the city, just in time to save his friend Selinuntius from public execution. Melos implores Selinuntius to hit him, in penance for his treachery, and Selinuntius asks him to do the same, for having doubted Melos' return while held captive on his promise. The King, forced to reexamine his position by their display and the crowd's reaction, decides to let Melos go with impunity.

Tributes 

In Dazai's hometown, Kanagi (now Goshogawara, Aomori), there is a diesel train nicknamed "Hashire Merosu," owned by the Tsugaru Railway Company.
"Melos no Yō ni ~Lonely Way~," the opening theme song for the anime series Blue Comet SPT Layzner refers to the story both in its title, and in the line "Hashire, Melos no yō ni" (Run, just like Melos), which appears in the chorus.
The third line in the second verse of the song Happy Birthday by The Blue Hearts is "Ame no naka o hashire, Melos" (Run, Melos, in the rain).
The AKB48 song "Melos no Michi" (Melos's Road) references the storyline in its lyrics.
The first line in the second verse of the song "Mahou de Choi²" of the anime Ojamajo Doremi references it in its lyrics: "Hashire merosu datte hashireba hyoihyoi".
Kashiwa Daisuke's song "Write Once, Run Melos" is program music based on the short story.
The 161st episode of the anime "Prince of Tennis" is titled "Run, Momo!" as a tribute to the story.
The 6th episode of the anime "Tsuki ga Kirei" is titled "Run, Melos!" as a tribute to the story.
In the Hikaru Utada song "Bōkyaku" (Oblivion) (feat. KOHH), The line "Hashire Melos" appears in KOHH's last verse.
The Wednesday Campanella song "Melos"
In the second half of the anime Tweeny Witches, Arusu, the protagonist, finds herself stuck in a similar situation and even mentions the tale itself.
The "Run, Melos! Music Festival" executive committee, headed by committee chairman Shoichiro Kawamura, was established in 2016 to let people know that there are many musical pieces based on "Run, Melos!" and the "Run, Melos! Music Festival" was held on June 25, 2017, in Hirosaki, Aomori Prefecture.
In The Intrigues of Haruhi Suzumiya, the protagonist Kyon compares Mikuru Asahina's waiting for him to the situation of Selinuntius waiting for the return of Melos to save him from certain death.

Adaptations 
 Hashire Merosu (Dorama, NHK 1955)
 Akai tori no kokoro: Nihon meisaku douwa shirīzu Hashire Merosu (Anime, TV Asahi 1979)
 Hashire Melos (Anime, Fuji TV 1981)
 Hashire Melos! (Anime movie, 1992)
 Terebi ehon Hashire Merosu (Recitation by Tarō Yamamoto in 2006)
 Aoi Bungaku episodes 9–10 (Anime, 2009)
 Bungo to Alchemist -Gears of Judgment episode 1 (Anime, 2020)

Japanese language teaching material 

According to Kunihiro Kouda, "Run, Melos!" was used as a Japanese language textbook for second graders in Japanese middle schools (13 to 14 years old) by Chukyo publishing in the 1965 Japanese fiscal year. In the beginning, it was also used in high school (15 to 17 years old) Japanese language textbooks. In addition, it was a Japanese middle school (13 to 15 years old) Japanese language textbook in the middle 1960s. Earlier, it was seen in textbooks between second and third grade in Japanese middle schools. Later, it began to consistently be a part of second grade Japanese curriculum after 1970. Due to its popularity, publishers would frequently resort to omitting the middle or end of the book. This practice carried out until the end of the 1972 Japanese fiscal year. In academia, emphasis was originally placed on the moral values the story displayed. Recently, it has been used for its literary value as well.

Bibliography 
 Run, Melos! and Other Stories, translated by Ralph F. McCarthy. Tokyo, Kodansha International, 1988.

References

External links 

  Hashire Merosu at Aozora Bunko
  Hashire Merosu—in rōmaji

1940 short stories
Japanese children's literature
Japanese short stories
Works by Osamu Dazai